Romeas Haek District is a district located in Svay Rieng Province, Cambodia. The district is subdivided into 16 khums and 204 phums. According to the 1998 census of Cambodia, it had a population of 111,505.

References 

Districts of Svay Rieng province